Coldwater Creek (also Cold Water Creek) is a 19-mile tributary of the Missouri River in north St. Louis County in the U.S. state of Missouri. It is known to be contaminated with radioactive wastes.

Location
The creek begins in a small spring-fed lake in Overland,  then flows north through the towns of Breckenridge Hills, St. Ann and Bridgeton, before entering a culvert underneath Lambert International Airport. North of the airport, it flows northeast through the cities of  Hazelwood, Berkeley, Florissant, Old Jamestown, Black Jack, and Spanish Lake. According to St. Louis Magazine, "It runs past schools, golf courses, and soccer fields."

The creek terminates in the Missouri River between the Lewis Bridge and the Columbia Bottom Conservation Area.

History

The name "Coldwater Creek" is a translation of the original French name Rivière de L'eau Froide. The Spaniards called it Rio Fernando, Spanish for "Ferdinand River." The French also called it Riviere aux Biches, French for "River of Roebucks."

Mallinckrodt nuclear waste contamination 
In December 1989 the U.S. Department of Energy reported that radioactive material was found to be present "in and along" the creek.  That release of information halted a flood-control project planned between the United States Army Corps of Engineers and local suburban communities for the previous eleven years.

The material was traced to two nearby dump sites, both from a common source: the Mallinckrodt Chemical Works. In 1942 Mallinckrodt had reached an exclusive agreement with the U.S. government's Manhattan Engineering District, and agency of the U.S. Department of Energy, to produce weapons-grade uranium at its factory north of downtown.  From 1947 the company and the AEC used a 21.7-acre property near Lambert Field for the purpose of burying steel drums containing the radioactive wastes from the downtown plant and other locations.  That site became the St. Louis Airport Storage Site (SLAPSS).  In 1966 the Cotter Corporation purchased minerals from the Mallinckrodt Chemical Works for refinement. Barium sulfate, along with other chemical and radiological extraction products, were stored at Latty Avenue. Additionally Cotter Corp. worked with B&K Construction to dry and transport material to Canon City, Colorado. When the process of extraction was determined to be unprofitable, the material was shipped in uncovered dumptrucks to a landfill site on Latty Avenue, and another, the West Lake Landfill, In Bridgeton, Mo.  Material from both the original SLAPPS site and from the Latty site eventually made its way into the creek bed and to many neighboring homes and properties.

In 1989 the creek was finalized on the National Priorities List of the Superfund program of the U.S. Environmental Protection Agency.

Between 2008 and 2011, local residents noticed what seemed an unusual concentration of cancers, other illnesses, and birth defects among their age cohort.  Many were graduates of McCluer North High School and organized around its class reunions.  In August 2015, the United States Army Corps of Engineers admitted that they found thorium-230 in the creek. In January 2016, the Centers for Disease Control and Prevention investigated the high rate of cancers in the area, and confirmed a potential link between the cluster and the polluted creek.

In 2022, radioactive material was found at Jana Elementary School in the Hazelwood School District in Florissant. The radioactive material includes lead-210, polonium, radium, and other toxic materials. The Army Corps of Engineers has been cleaning up the creek for decades.

References

Rivers of St. Louis County, Missouri
Rivers of Missouri
Superfund sites in Missouri